Ujkovice is a municipality and village in Mladá Boleslav District in the Central Bohemian Region of the Czech Republic. It has about 100 inhabitants.

References

Villages in Mladá Boleslav District